Lajos László Détári (born 24 April 1963) is a Hungarian football manager and former player who played as a midfielder. At the height of his career (1984–1994), he was a well-respected player throughout Europe, winning "Player of the Year" titles in Hungary, Greece and Switzerland.

Playing career
Détári was born in Budapest. In 1984 he made his debut for the Hungarian national team against Switzerland. He scored 13 goals in 61 caps for his country until 1994. He was a participant at the 1986 FIFA World Cup in Mexico, where Hungary failed to progress from the group stage. Détári scored one goal in the 2:0 victory against Canada. To this day, this remains the last scored goal by Hungary in the World Cup finals.

In 1987 Détári was transferred from Honvéd Budapest to Eintracht Frankfurt in the Bundesliga DM 3.6 millions (equivalent to € million in ). In the 1987–88 season he scored 11 goals in 33 caps. On 28 May 1988, Détári scored the goal in the 1–0 victory against VfL Bochum at the German Cup final. It was a direct free kick just outside the box, leading Eintracht to their fourth German Cup win. Détári had played in all six cup games that season.

At the beginning of the following season Détári was on the move for a world record fee of £6 million. He arrived in Greece to a tumultuous reception by the Piraeus club's supporters. Unfortunately, he did not justify the expectations of Olympiacos or the money spent in his acquisition, leaving after only two years in the midst of the scandal involving the owner of Olympiacos, George Koskotas. Still, in those two years he managed 35 goals in 60 league games, many of them from set plays which was his specialty.

After leaving Greece, Détári  played for many clubs. Further clubs that Détári played for were Bologna F.C. 1909, Ancona Calcio, Neuchâtel Xamax and VSE St. Pölten.

Coaching career
After his playing days were over, Détári tried his hand at coaching in Hungary with Honved, in Vietnam for three months and in Greece with Panserraikos. He also coached Hungarian team Nyíregyháza and Haladás Szombathely. From March to October 2006, he was also co-trainer of the Hungarian national team active under Péter Bozsik. He started the 2007–08 season as MFC Sopron boss, but was sacked in October following a number of poor results in the league. In January 2008, he was hired as a coach by F.C. Poros, the local team of the Greek island of Poros.

Honvéd
On 2 January 2002, Détári was appointed as the manager of Budapest Honvéd. He replaced Róbert Glázer who left for Újpest. 
Détári's team surprisingly beat the Hungarian champions Zalaegerszeg by 1–0 in the Bozsik Stadion. On 20 August 2004, he returned to Honvéd as an assistant coach with György Bognár. The pair replaced György Gálhidi who was sacked by Honvéd after an unsuccessful start in the Hungarian League.

Haladás
Détári achieved promotion with Szombathelyi Haladás in 2003. On 27 August 2003, Détári resigned from his position even after his team made a good start.

Ferencváros
On 30 August 2011, Détári was appointed as the head coach of the Hungarian club Ferencváros due to the resignation of László Prukner after several defeats in the Hungarian League and the early farewell from the Europa League. Ferencváros won the first match with Détári by 2–0 against Zalaegerszeg which was coached by Ferencváros's former coach László Prukner.

Honours
Budapest Honvéd
 Hungarian League: 1983–84, 1984–85, 1985–86
 Hungarian Cup: 1984–85

Eintracht Frankfurt
 DFB-Pokal: 1987–88

Olympiacos
 Greek Cup: 1989–90

'''Individual
 Hungarian top scorer: 1985, 1986, 1987

References

1963 births
Living people
Footballers from Budapest
Hungarian footballers
Hungarian football managers
Hungarian expatriate footballers
Association football midfielders
1986 FIFA World Cup players
Hungary international footballers
Budapest Honvéd FC players
Budapest Honvéd FC managers
Szombathelyi Haladás football managers
Diósgyőri VTK managers
Nemzeti Bajnokság I players
Eintracht Frankfurt players
Bundesliga players
Expatriate footballers in West Germany
Olympiacos F.C. players
Super League Greece players
Expatriate footballers in Greece
Ferencvárosi TC footballers
A.C. Ancona players
Bologna F.C. 1909 players
Genoa C.F.C. players
Serie A players
Serie B players
Expatriate footballers in Italy
Neuchâtel Xamax FCS players
Expatriate footballers in Switzerland
Expatriate footballers in Austria
Budapesti VSC footballers
Expatriate footballers in Vietnam
Hungarian expatriate sportspeople in Vietnam
Ferencvárosi TC managers
Panserraikos F.C. managers
FC Tatabánya managers
FC Bihor Oradea managers
BFC Siófok managers
Nyíregyháza Spartacus FC managers
Hà Nội FC (1956) managers
Nemzeti Bajnokság I managers
Hungarian expatriate sportspeople in West Germany